Sila Lat is a district (amphoe) in the northwestern part of Sisaket province, northeastern Thailand.

History
The minor district (king amphoe) was established on 1 July 1997, when four tambons were split off from Rasi Salai district.

On 15 May 2007, all 81 minor districts were upgraded to full districts. On 24 August, the upgrade became official.

Geography
Neighboring districts are (from the south clockwise): Rasi Salai of Sisaket Province; Phon Sai, Nong Hi, and Phanom Phrai of Roi Et province; and Maha Chana Chai of Yasothon province.

Administration
The district is divided into four sub-districts (tambons), which are further subdivided into 44 villages (mubans). There are no municipal (thesaban) areas; there are four tambon administrative organizations (TAO).

References

External links
amphoe.com

Sila Lat